The 1986 Castrol 500 was an endurance race for cars complying with CAMS Touring Car regulations, which were based on FIA Group A rules. The event was staged on 14 September 1986 over 129 laps of the 3.9 km Sandown International Motor Racing Circuit in Victoria, Australia, a total distance of 503 km. The race, which was Round 3 of both the 1986 Australian Endurance Championship and the 1986 Australian Manufacturers' Championship, was the 21st "Sandown 500" endurance race.

Cars competed in three engine displacement classes:
 Class A: Up to 3000ccc
 Class B: 2001 to 3000cc
 Class C: 3001 to 6000cc

The race was won by the Peter Jackson Nissan Skyline turbo of George Fury and Glenn Seton from their teammates Gary Scott and Terry Sheil, with the V8 Holden Commodore of Allan Grice and Graeme Bailey finishing third. 1986 was the first time a turbo powered car had won the Sandown enduro, and the first of six consecutive Sandown 500's won by turbo power.

Peter Brock and Allan Moffat, who between them had won 14 of the previous 17 Sandown enduros dating back to Moffat's first win in 1969, finished 4th in their Holden Dealer Team Commodore. Brock had won pole for the race in Saturday's "Castrol Chargers"  top ten runoff with a time of 1:49.84. Defending race winners Jim Richards and Tony Longhurst finished two laps down in 5th place in their JPS Team BMW 635 CSi.

Robbie Francevic, the 1986 Australian Touring Car Champion, failed to start the race after his car was withdrawn on race morning following his comments that the Volvo 240T he was to drive wouldn't be competitive as the Volvo Dealer Team had not been able to practice due to the team still building the car. Francevic's public comments saw him dismissed from the team by team manager John Shepherd the day after the race.

The Holden Commodore of Allan Grice and Graeme Bailey won Class C (3001 to 6000cc), the Nissan Skyline of George Fury and Glenn Seton won Class B (2001 to 3000cc) and the Toyota Corolla of Mike Quinn and John Faulkner placed first in Class A (Up to 2000cc).

The 1986 Castrol 500 saw the touring car racing debut of 19 year old Mark Skaife. Co-driving with Peter Williamson in his Toyota Celica Supra, the pair finished 10th outright.

Results
As sourced:

Castrol Chargers
A "Castrol Chargers" session, contested for the first time in 1986, involved the top ten cars from qualifying undertaking two single-lap runs to determine the final grid order for the race.

Race

Statistics
 Pole Position - #05 Peter Brock - Holden VK Commodore SS Group A - 1:49.84
 Fastest Lap - #2 Allan Grice - Holden VK Commodore SS Group A - 1:52.10 (Touring Car Lap Record)

See also
1986 Australian Touring Car season

References

External links
 1986 Castrol 500 Sandown highlights, www.youtube.com

Motorsport at Sandown
Castrol 500
Pre-Bathurst 500